Radha Krishna Vivah Sthali is a Hindu temple dedicated to Hindu deities Radha and Krishna. The temple site is present in the Bhandirvan village of Mant constituency in Mathura district, Uttar Pradesh, India. The site holds cultural importance as according to Sanskrit scriptures like Braham Vaivarta Purana and Garga Samhita, Radha Krishna got married in Bhandirvan forest in the presence of Brahma, the creator, who also became the priest and solemnized their wedding ceremony. Annually, this divine wedding is celebrated on the occasion of Phulera Dooj which usually falls in the month of February - March. 

Bhandirvan is listed as one of the sacred forests of Braj region. Inside the premises of Bhandirvan, there is Venu Kup, a sacred well which was believed to be created by Lord Krishna himself with his flute. Near Venu Kup, there is a pair of huge Bhandir Vat (Banyan trees) beneath which Radha Krishna's marriage ceremony took place. Presently, there is a small temple dedicated to Radha Krishna beneath Bhandir Vat. There is also a temple dedicated to Lord Balrama inside the temple premises.

History 

Bhandirvan is one of the most prominent forest among the forests of Vrindavan. It is celebrated as the forest of Braj where Krishna used to enjoy taking lunch with his cowherd friends under the massive Bhandirvata banyan tree. Bhandirvan has many legends associated with it. Some of the major leelas (events) linked with Bhandirvan are :-

Radha Krishna Vivah Leela 

Bhandirvan has witnessed the divine marriage ceremony of Radha Krishna. The wedding ceremony took place in the presence of Lord Brahma who also acted as the priest. This unison of Radha Krishna was happened in the absence of society. The locals say that only 10 million confidential associates of the Divine Couple (that included sakhis, peacocks, parrots, cows and monkeys) participated in this marriage. To give more importance to "Parakiya rasa" (love without any social foundation) over "Svakiya rasa" (married relationship), this marriage was kept hidden. According to scriptures like Brahma Vaivarta Purana and Garga Samhita, the story mentioned is as follows :-

"One day, Nanda Baba went along with infant Krishna to Bhandirvan for cow grazing. When Nand baba sat under a tree for rest, a ferocious storm started blowing and the    environment became dark. Nand baba got scared about the safety of his little boy. Lord Krishna also acted as if he was frightened and hugged Nand baba with fear. But then, Nand baba saw the beautiful gopi, Radha Rani approaching him from the storm in her divine form. She was glowing with the beauty. Realizing that it was a play, Nand baba gave the infant to Goddess Radha and said that he knows that she is very dear to Lord Krishna as he was already being told about the divine form of Radha Krishna by Sage Garga . He said that she can enjoy with Shri Krishna and after that leave the infant back home to Yashoda.
Radha Rani was very happy to see the infant Krishna and kissed him. Suddenly, a palace was appeared in front of her. The palace was shining with jewels and rubies. And then she saw the infant Krishna got vanished from her lap while a young handsome man appeared before her wearing jewelry and a crown. Within no time, she immediately realized it that it was the divine form of Lord Krishna. Krishna praised Radha and acknowledged his deep love for her. He told Radha that she was the other half of him. But, Radha shared her pain of separation with Krishna. To which, Lord Krishna consoled her and asked her to wait as he would make her happy. At that moment, Lord Brahma appeared in front of them and under his guidance performed their wedding ceremony by making the couple exchanged their garlands and chanting Vedic mantras sitting in front of the holy fire. This marriage ceremony was called Gandharva Vivah. Thereafter, Lord Krishna and Goddess Radha spent time together in delightful pastimes. After some time, Lord Krishna again returned to his infant form and promised Radha that they would keep returning to Bhandirvan for their lovable pastimes. Thereafter, Goddess Radha took the infant Krishna back to his mother Yashoda".

Balrama Killed Demon Pralambasura 
Besides, the Radha Krishna Vivah leela, the site is also famous for leela associated with  Lord Balrama and Pralambasur. Pralambasura was a strong and powerful demon sent by Mathura's tyrant king Kansa to kill Krishna and Balrama. It was at Bhandirvan where Pralambhasura demon was killed by Lord Balrama. The story goes like this -

"Once, a great demon named Pralambasura entered the playgroup of Gopas (cowherds) disguised as a boy, with the intention to kill both Balarama and Krishna. But Krishna, who was already aware of this, began to think how to kill the demon. However, externally he received him as a friend. According to the game rules, the defeated members in duel fighting games had to carry the victorious members on their backs. When the party of Balarama, came out victorious, the boys in Krishna’s party had to carry them on their backs through the Bhandirvan forest. Imitating others, Pralambasura, who appeared there as a cowherd boy in Krishna’s party, carried Balarama on his back. In order to avoid the company of Krishna, Pralambasura carried Balarama far away. But soon the demon began to feel the heavy burden of Balarama, and not being able to withstand that, finally assumed his real form. At first, Balarama was surprised by the demon’s appearance, but he quickly understood that he was being carried away a demon who wanted to kill Him. Immediately, He struck the head of Pralambhasura with his strong fist, who fell down dead with a tremendous sound, as blood poured from his mouth".

Krishna Swallowed Forest Fire 
Lord Krishna performed many leelas in Bhandirvan which also includes saving the Gopas(cowherds) and the calves from a colossal forest fire. According to legend, one day, Lord Krishna and his friends brought the cows to drink water at the river Yamuna and then let them graze freely. The boys became so absorbed in their games that they were unaware of their cows wandering off. The cows made their way to the Munjavan forest where they got lost and couldn't return. When Krishna's cowherds friends could not find the cows they also went to look for the cows in the forest without Krishna and Balrama. At this time, the servants of Kansa set the forest on fire, which spread everywhere in a moment and surrounded the cows and cowherd boys. Seeing no other way to save themselves they called out to Krishna, who arrived there in an instant and told his friends to close their eyes, Lord Krishna swallowed the colossal forest-fire immediately saving the cows and his friends. The place where Shri Krishna swallowed the forest fire is called Munjatavi or Isikatavi.

Krishna Killed Demon Vatsasura 
In Bhandirvan, Lord Krishna also performed the leela of killing  the demon Vatsasura. Once, Lord Krishna and Balarama were playing on the bank of the Yamuna. At that time, a demon of the name Vatsasura came there intending to kill them. Disguised as a calf, the demon mingled with the other calves. But Krishna, who already noticed this, immediately told Balarama about the demon's entry. Soon, both of them followed the demon. Lord Krishna caught hold of two hind legs and tail of the demon-calf, whipped him around with great force and threw him up into a tree which leads to the death of Vatsasura.

Festival 
The main festival of temple is called "Byahula Utsav" in which wedding ceremony of Radha Krishna is performed annually by senior priests. According to Hindu calendar, the festival is celebrated on the occasion of Phulera dooj.

Temple Gallery

How to Reach 

 Location - Bhandirvan, Mant assembly constituency in Mathura district, Uttar Pradesh, India - 281202.
 By Rail - Nearest Railway station is Mathura Junction. Mathura is well connected with trains from across India.
 By Air - The nearest airport is in Agra at a distance of 100 km.
 By Road - Bhandirvan is around 27 km away from Mathura railway station and 20 km away from Krishna Balrama Mandir, Vrindavan. The local transport and cab facility is available at both the locations.

Nearby attractions

Vanshivat, Vrindavan 
Just nearby Bhandirvan (around 600 metres) is Vanshivat. In this place, Krishna used to eat lunch with his sakhas (friends) and play His flute to call Radharani and all the gopis. It is famous for the Maharaas. Lord Krishna along with Goddess Radha and gopis used to do Raslila under the Vanshivat tree. Presently, there is Radha Krishna temple constructed in Vanshivata and also the Vanshivata tree is still present in the temple premises.

Belvan, Vrindavan 

Belvan is around 8 km away from Bhandirvan. The place is famous for Goddess Mahalakshmi temple. According to locals, it is believed that Goddess Lakshmi is still doing austerities to be the part of Radha Krishna's  Raslila.

Maan Sarovar, Vrindavan 
Maan Sarovar is around 8 km away from Bhandirvan. In Maan Sarovar, there is a kund (lake) surrounded by huge trees and bird sanctuary. According to folklore, once Radharani pretends to get angry (Maan) from Krishna and came to this lake. On learning this, Krishna followed her to this lake and by his mesmerizing talk pleased her. There is temple on the bank of this lake dedicated to Srimati Radharani.

See also 

 Nidhivan, Vrindavan
Radha Damodar Temple, Vrindavan
Radha Madan Mohan Temple, Vrindavan
Radha Vallabh Temple, Vrindavan
Banke Bihari Temple, Vrindavana
 Radha Rani Temple, Barsana
 Radha Ramana Temple, Vrindavan
 Dwarkadheesh Temple, Mathura

References

External links 
 https://www.patrika.com/agra-news/bhandirvan-vrindavan-1290999/
 http://radhanathswamiyatras.com/forests-of-vrindavan/bhandirvan/
 https://iskcondesiretree.com/page/bhadiravan

Hindu temples in Mathura district
Radha Krishna temples
Tourist attractions in Mathura district